Jangalbari Fort is a fort situated in Jangalbari village under Karimganj Upazila of Kishoreganj District.

History
After the battle of Egarasindhur, 16th century ruler Isa Khan took over the Janglabari Fort from Laksman Singh Hajra.  After Musa Khan became loyal to Mughal foce, the descendants of Isa Khan transferred their families from Sonargaon to Jangalbari Fort.

References

Palaces in Bangladesh
Forts in Bangladesh
Kishoreganj District
Archaeological sites in Kishoreganj district